Paragraph 78 (also stylized as: § 78) is a Russian film by Mikhail Khleborodov released in 2007. The film was split into two parts Paragraph 78, Punkt 1 released on February 22, 2007, and Paragraph 78, Punkt 2 released on March 29, 2007. The screenplay was based on a 1995 story by Ivan Okhlobystin. Andrey Lazarchuk, the Russian writer of the modern turborealism literature style, wrote a novel based on this film (February 2007).

Plot 
Future: soft drugs are legalized, Bowling is Olympic sport and countries such as the Asian Union and the United Pan-American States have appeared. An assault group under the command of Gudvin (Gosha Kutsenko) breaks apart because of his conflict with Skif (Vladimir Vdovichenkov).

Five years later Lisa (Anastasiya Slanevskaya) has left Skif and is married to Gudvin. Russia, the Asian Union and The United Pan-American States have signed a disarmament treaty, but keep a close watch one another.

A state of emergency is declared at one of Russia's secret and, per international treaties, prohibited laboratories on an island in the Arctic Ocean, causing an emergency beacon to begin broadcasting, creating the risk of discovery by the other nations. To prevent this from happening Gudvin assembles his former group. By that time Spam (Anatoli Belyj) is jailed, Luba (Stanislav Duzhnikov) works in that same prison as a warden, Festival (Grigori Siyatvinda) is engaged in commerce of banned drugs (lysergic acid), Pai (Azis Beyshinaliev) works in a casino, and Skif ruins himself with drink.

Together they depart to that island to penetrate the base and stop the emergency beacon.

Cast 
 Gosha Kutsenko as Gudvin
 Vladimir Vdovichenkov as Skif
 Grigory Siyatvinda as Festival
 Anastasiya Slanevskaya as Lisa
 Stanislav Duzhnikov as Luba
 Azis Beyshinaliev as Pai
 Anatoliy Beliy as Spam
 Yusup Bakshiyev as Doktor
 Mikhail Yefremov as Prison commander

Critics 
 The film was heavily criticised for a strong resemblance to a number of films, including Resident Evil, Doom, Phantom Force, Dragon Fighter and Aliens.
 The film was heavily packed by product placement as the recent Russian films Night Watch  and Day Watch. This includes Russian Channel One, Fan chips, Men's Health magazine, Pikador ketchup, Mail.ru service, Radio Maximum, Golden barrel beer, Grand Prix vodka, Wrigley's Spearmint, Qtek S110, Creative player, Panasonic notebook, etc.

References

External links 
 
 
 
 
 

2007 films
2007 science fiction action films
2007 action thriller films
2000s Russian-language films
Russian science fiction action films
Russian science fiction thriller films
Russian action thriller films
Films released in separate parts